The Little Weir River, an anabranch of the Barwon River within the Murray–Darling basin, is located in the South Downs district of Queensland and the Orana district of New South Wales, Australia.

The river leaves Barwon River, north of Mungindi, Queensland, and flows generally south-west, before reaching its confluence with the Barwon River, near Moyan, in New South Wales; descending  over its  course.

See also

 List of rivers of New South Wales
 Rivers of Queensland
Border Rivers

References

Rivers of New South Wales
Murray-Darling basin